Major Lawrence Edward Knox(1836–1873) was a British Army officer and founder of The Irish Times. He was born in the Kemp Town area of Brighton in East Sussex, England. His parents were Arthur Edward Knox of Castlereagh, near Killala, County Mayo, (later Trotton House, Sussex) and Jane Parsons, daughter of Laurence Parsons, 2nd Earl of Rosse.

In 1859, at the age of 22, he founded The Irish Times. Knox purchased an Ensigncy in the 63rd Foot in 1854 and was promoted Lieutenant without purchase later the same year. He purchased a Captaincy in 1857. He exchanged into the 11th Foot in 1858. In 1866 he was commissioned Major in the Tower Hamlets Militia. In 1868 he was elected to Parliament for Sligo Borough, although the election was later declared void and the borough disenfranchised for corruption. Eighteen months later, in May 1870, he contested a by-election in Mallow on the platform of Isaac Butt's fledgling Home Government Association, but was defeated.

Knox died at his home in Dublin on 24 January 1873, of scarlet fever.

References

External links

1836 births
1873 deaths
Military personnel from Sussex
People from Brighton
63rd Regiment of Foot officers
Devonshire Regiment officers
British Militia officers
19th-century British newspaper founders
London Regiment officers
Members of the Parliament of the United Kingdom for County Sligo constituencies (1801–1922)
UK MPs 1868–1874
19th-century British journalists
British male journalists